Mikao Usui (臼井甕男, 15 August 1865 – 9 March 1926, commonly Usui Mikao in Japanese) was the father of a form of spiritual practice known as Reiki, used as an alternative therapy for the treatment of physical, emotional, and mental diseases. According to the inscription on his memorial stone, Usui taught Reiki to over 2,000 people during his lifetime. Eleven of these students continued their training to reach the Shinpiden level, a level equivalent to the Western third degree, or Master level.

Early life, family and education 
Usui was born on 15 August 1865 in the village of Taniai (now called Miyama cho) in the Yamagata district of the Gifu Prefecture, Japan, which is now located near present-day Nagoya. Usui's father's common name was Uzaemon, and his mother was from the Kawai family. His brothers, Sanya and Kuniji, became a doctor and a policeman, respectively. He also had an older sister called Tsuru. Usui's ancestors were the once influential Chiba clan and were Hatamoto samurai. According to the inscription on his memorial, Tsunetane Chiba, a military commander during the end of the Heian period and the start of the Kamakura period (1180–1230), was one of Usui's ancestors. In 1551, Toshitane Chiba conquered the city Usui and thereafter all family members acquired that name. Usui was raised as a samurai from childhood, specifically in the martial arts techniques of aiki (合氣術).

Although there are many stories extant in the United States that Mikao Usui earned a doctorate of theology at the theological seminary of the University of Chicago, it is evident from further research that he never attended, let alone received any degree from the University of Chicago.

Career and activities
As an adult, it is believed that he traveled to several Western countries, including the Americas, Europe, and China as a part of his continued study. His studies included history, medicine, Buddhism, Christianity, psychology, and Taoism.

It is believed that the aim of Usui's teachings was to provide a method for students to achieve connection with the "universal life force" energy that would help them in their self-development. What sets Usui's teachings apart from other hands-on healing methods is his use of reiju or attunement to remind students of their spiritual connection. It seems that all students of Usui received five principles to live by and those with a further interest in the teachings became dedicated students. There does not appear to have been a distinction between clients and students in the beginning though this may have changed at some point. People began coming to Usui Mikao possibly for different purposes – some for healing and others for the spiritual teachings.

Shugendō is a Japanese mountain ascetic shamanism, which incorporates Shinto and Buddhist practices. The roles of Shugendō practitioners include offering religious services such as fortune telling, divination, channelling, prayer, ritual incantations and exorcism. Shugendo was often used by family clans to heal disease or to avoid misfortune.

Claims of Reiki's Christian origins
Hawayo Takata, a Reiki Master under the tutelage of Chujiro Hayashi (林 忠次郎, 1880–1940), lied about Reiki's history of development to make Reiki more appealing to the West. To this end she made a relation of Reiki with Jesus Christ and not with Buddhism. She also falsely presented Usui as the dean of a Christian school. While he had obtained the knowledge of Reiki from the Buddhist religious book Tantra of the Lightning Flash, Takata claimed that he had been inspired from the story of Jesus Christ, who had healed with the touch of his hand, and so had come to America to learn Reiki. She told this to spread Reiki among Christians too, believing it would otherwise be extinct. However, in 1994, the original manuscript [refs needed] was found, which claimed that Reiki had originated from Gautama Buddha.

Activity in the 1920s
During the early 1920s, Usui did a 21-day practice on Mount Kurama called discipline of prayer and fasting, according to translator Hyakuten Inamoto. Common belief dictates that it was during these 21 days that Usui developed Reiki. As Mount Hiei is the main Tendai complex in Japan, and is very close to Kyoto, it has been surmised that Usui would also have practiced there if he had been a lay priest. This teaching included self-discipline, fasting and prayer.

Personal life and death
Usui married Sadako Suzuki, who bore children by the names of Fuji and Toshiko. Fuji (1908–1946) became a teacher at Tokyo University. Toshiko died at age 22 in 1935.

Usui died on 9 March 1926 of a stroke.

The family's ashes are buried at the grave site at the Saihō-ji Temple in Tokyo.

See also
 Alternative medicine
 Chujiro Hayashi
 Frank Arjava Petter
 Glossary of alternative medicine
 Hawayo Takata
 Laying on of hands

Notes

1865 births
1926 deaths
Japanese Buddhists
Reiki practitioners